The RS100, first launched in 2009 by RS Sailing, is a singlehanded skiff. Possessing an asymmetric spinnaker the boat has two PY numbers of 981 for the 10.2 rig and 1004 for the 8.4 rig. The RS100 has a racing event circuit in the United Kingdom and in Europe, with the Eurotour beginning in 2011.

Performance and design
A comprehensive development blog was kept throughout the design and testing and launch of the RS100.

Awards
 2010 - Awarded Yachts & Yachting magazine's Dinghy of the Year in the UK.
 2011 -  Voted Sailing World magazine's overall Boat of the Year in the USA magazine's 25th annual awards.

World Championships

References

External links
 RS Sailing (Global HQ)
 ISAF Connect to Sailing
 International RS Classes Association (IRSCA)
 UK RS Association

Dinghies
2000s sailboat type designs
Classes of World Sailing
World championships in sailing
Sailboat type designs by Paul Handley
Sailboat types built by RS Sailing